The transitional colilargo (Microakodontomys transitorius)  also known as the intermediate lesser grass mouse, is a species of rodent in the tribe Oryzomyini known only from two individuals found in the Federal District in Brazil. Although described as a link between oryzomyine and akodontine rodents and placed in its own genus, Microakodontomys, Weksler and coworkers dismissed it as an aberrant Oligoryzomys.

References

Literature cited
Musser, G.G. and Carleton, M.D. 2005. Superfamily Muroidea. Pp. 894–1531 in Wilson, D.E. and Reeder, D.M. (eds.). Mammal Species of the World: a taxonomic and geographic reference. 3rd ed. Baltimore: The Johns Hopkins University Press, 2 vols., 2142 pp. 

Oryzomyini
Mammals described in 1993
Taxa named by Philip Hershkovitz